Conroe High School is a secondary school in Conroe, Texas. The school is a part of the Conroe Independent School District and serves most of the city of Conroe as well as portions of unincorporated Montgomery County, including the community of River Plantation. The campus was initially built in 1964 to replace the older Davy Crockett High School as Conroe's primary high school. The campus has been updated, renovated and expanded through various bond measures, including in 2004, 2015, and 2019.

Also found at Conroe High School is the Academy for Science and Health Professions, a magnet program which enrolls students through an application process from the Conroe High School and Caney Creek High School attendance zones.

Beginning in the 2013–14 school year, Conroe High School's freshmen class attend school at the Conroe High School 9th Grade Campus.

History
Various buildings have served as the public high school for the residents of Conroe and the surrounding area. Conroe Mill School opened in 1886 with a single classroom and educated students for five months each year. Conroe Public School was built in 1899 and served students in 10 grades. In 1902, the first four students received their high school diplomas. In 1911, Conroe's first brick school, the JOH Bennette School, was built. Davy Crockett High School, built in 1926, was also referred to as "Conroe High" by local residents. The current Conroe High School was built in 1964. From 1968–1969, Conroe High School was desegregated.

Demographics
As of the 2018–2019 school year, CHS had 4,091 students enrolled.
55.4% were Hispanic
30.0% were White
10.6% were African American
1.9% were Asian
0.4% were American Indian
0.1% were Pacific Islander
1.6% were part of Two or More races

58.7% of students were eligible for free or reduced-price lunch. The school was eligible for Title I funding.

Academics
At the beginning of each school year, the Texas Education Agency assigns schools a grade based on three different indices: Student Achievement, School Progress, and Closing the Gaps. For each index, schools are classified as "Met Standard" if they receive a grade of at least 60 out of 100. In 2018, Conroe High School received an overall score of 79 and was classified as "Met Standard." The school received scores of 81 in Student Achievement, 81 in School Progress, and 74 in Closing the Gaps. In addition, the agency also awards schools with "Distinction Designations" if they outperform schools with similar demographics. In 2018, Conroe High School was awarded two of the seven possible Distinction Designations: Academic Achievement in Science and Academic Achievement in Social Studies.

Feeder patterns
The following schools feed into Conroe High School:

Elementary (K-4) schools:
 Anderson
 Armstrong
 Giesinger
 Houston
 Patterson
 Reaves
 Rice
 Runyan
 Wilkinson

Flex (K-6) schools:
 Gordon-Reed
 Stewart
 
Intermediate (5-6) schools:
 Bozman
 Cryar
 Travis

Junior High (7-8) schools:
 Peet
 Stockton

9th Grade Campus:
 Conroe High School 9th Grade Campus

Notable alumni

 Kyle Bennett, Pro BMX and Olympian
 Will Bolt, current head baseball coach for the Nebraska Cornhuskers
 Larry Brantley, voice of Wishbone
 Jeromy Burnitz, former MLB outfielder for seven different teams
 Rock Cartwright, former NFL running back for the Washington Redskins and San Francisco 49ers
 Andrew Cashner, MLB pitcher for the Texas Rangers
Jonathan Daviss, actor
 Colin Edwards, Motorcross Racer, World Superbike Champion, Current Moto GP Racer
 Wiley Feagin, NFL lineman for the original Baltimore Colts & Washington Redskins
 Annette Gordon-Reed, American historian and law professor
 Roy Harris, Heavyweight boxer
 Will Metcalf (Class of 2002), investment banker and Republican member of the Texas House of Representatives from Conroe, beginning January 2015
 Rod Myers, former MLB outfielder for the Kansas City Royals
 Tyke Tolbert (Class of 1986), Wide Receivers coach for the NFL New York Giants.

Cheryl Dee Fergeson Case 
On August 23, 1980, sixteen-year-old Cheryl Dee Fergeson, a volleyball player from a visiting high school, was raped and strangled in a Conroe High School restroom. After being reported missing, her body was found in the auditorium sound room loft by Clarence Brandley and another janitor. The victim was white, leading to a heated, racially charged court case due to evidence that the accused, black janitor Clarence Brandley, was convicted and sentenced to death based exclusively on his race. After 9 years on Death Row, Brandley was exonerated and released. Even though there was evidence pointing to two white males, neither has ever been charged. In 1991 British investigative journalist Nick Davies published "White Lies" - Rape, Murder, and Justice Texas Style. his investigation of the case. Clarence Brandley's story is also told in the movie Whitewash: The Clarence Bradley Story (2002)

References

External links

 Conroe High School
 Conroe High School Profile
 Conroe Independent School District
 Conroe Alumni Website

Conroe Independent School District high schools
Magnet schools in Texas
Conroe, Texas
1964 establishments in Texas
Educational institutions established in 1964